The Thomasville Historic District is a historic district in the city of Thomasville, Alabama.  Thomasville was founded in 1888, along the then newly constructed railroad between Mobile and Selma.  The city's business district suffered a major fire in 1899, with only one brick building surviving. The historic district features examples of early commercial, Queen Anne, Colonial Revival, Craftsman, and regional vernacular architecture. The historic district is centered on the old business district and is roughly bounded by U.S. Highway 43, West Front Street, Wilson Street, and West Third Street.  It is a part of the Clarke County Multiple Property Submission and was placed on the National Register of Historic Places on February 12, 1999.

References

National Register of Historic Places in Clarke County, Alabama
Historic districts in Clarke County, Alabama
Colonial Revival architecture in Alabama
Queen Anne architecture in Alabama
American Craftsman architecture in Alabama
Historic districts on the National Register of Historic Places in Alabama